MQQ or mqq may refer to:

 MQQ, the IATA code for Moundou Airport, Chad
 MQQ, the Telegraph code for Miluo East railway station, Yueyang, Hunan, China
 mqq, the ISO 639-3 code for Minokok language, Malaysia